The Federal University of Juiz de Fora (UFJF) is a public research university in Brazil. Throughout its over 50 years of existence, the university has undergone significant growth, strengthening the quality of undergraduate and graduate education while maintaining its role as an agent of community development.

History

UFJF was established in 1960 by an act of Brazilian President Juscelino Kubitscheck. At that time, colleges functioning in the city of Juiz de Fora were officially integrated by the government to constitute a university. In the earlier years, the courses offered were Medicine, Engineering, Economic Science, Law, Pharmacy and Dentistry. Later, the courses of Geography, Languages & Literature, Philosophy, Biological Sciences, Social Science and History were also opened.

The campus was built in 1969 and the courses offered under licensure were distributed among different campus units. The Social Communication (Journalism) course was created and became part of the Law Faculty departments.

During the 1970s, three institutes were created at the campus: Institute of Exact Sciences (ICE), Institute of Biological Sciences (ICB) and Institute of Human Sciences and Letters (ICHL), offering undergraduate programs. Later, these institutes also offered a range of postgraduate courses and research programs. Recent years have seen significant increases in external research funding, research staff, and graduates at these University Institutes.

Other research centers were established at the campus: the Biology of Reproduction Center (CBR) in 1971, which works as an animal facility and the Social Research Center (CPS), involved in research subjects such as urbanism, health, employment, culture and education.

The UFJF Historical Archive was founded in 1985 and represents an important source for local, regional and national history research, functioning as a documentation and educational center. Two years later, the UFJF Press was established. Its academic publishing includes journals and books in a wide variety of fields.
In the technology and administrative fields, the Regional Center for Innovation and Transference of Technology (Critt), established in 1995, and the Technology Center-Agrosoft (Núcleo Softex), created in 1996, play a critical role in the regional development of new technologies by teaching and training new professionals. Since the 1990s, the university is also committed to promoting and establishing, with great success, Junior Enterprises specialized in different areas and formed exclusively by undergraduate students. In 2001, a UFJF Junior Enterprise was granted an ISO 9001 Certificate.

In 1999, a new academic unit was established: the Health Sciences Center (CCS), which comprises the School of Medicine, the School of Physiotherapy, the School of Nursing and the School of Dentistry. Several major hospitals are affiliated with the CCS.

In 2006, a new teaching hospital, the Health Care Center (CAS), was built as a resource to improve teaching, research, patient care and public service, increasing the services provided to nearby communities. In the same year, two other units were created: the Arts and Design Institute (IAD) and the Faculty of Languages and Literature.

Schools and institutes 
 Institute for Exact Sciences
 Computer Sciences Department
 Department of Physics
 Department of Chemistry
 Department of Statistics
 Department of Mathematics
 Institute of Biological Sciences
 Department of Anatomy
 Department of Biology
 Department of Biochemistry
 Department of Botany
 Department of Human Nutrition
 Department of Morphology
 Department of Parasitology, Immunology and Microbiology
 Department of Pharmacology
 Department of Physiology
 Department of Zoology
 Institute of Human Sciences
 Department of Philosophy
 Department of Social Sciences
 Department of Psychology
 Department of Tourism
 Department of History
 Department of Geography
 Department of Religious Studies
 Institute of Arts And Design
 Department of Art (Art Education, Design, Cinema, Fashion Design, Visual Art)
 Department of Music
 School of Linguistics and Literature
 School of Medicine
 School of Physical Education and Sports
 School of Education
 School of Communications
 School of Engineering
 School of Architecture and Urbanism
 School of Law
 School of Economics
 School of Administration and Accounting

See also 
 Brazil University Rankings
 Universities and Higher Education in Brazil

External links

  
 Official website in English

Federal universities of Brazil
Educational institutions established in 1960
Universities and colleges in Minas Gerais
Juiz de Fora
1960 establishments in Brazil